Bruce Julianto Diporedjo (born 28 July 1993) is a Surinamese international footballer of Javanese-Indonesian descent who plays as a midfielder.

References

External links 
 

1993 births
Living people
Surinamese people of Indonesian descent
Surinamese people of Javanese descent
Surinamese footballers
SVB Eerste Divisie players
Inter Moengotapoe players
Suriname international footballers
Association football midfielders